The economy of Ghana has a diverse and rich resource base, including the manufacturing and exportation of digital technology goods, automotive and ship construction and exportation, and the exportation of diverse and rich resources such as hydrocarbons and industrial minerals. These have given Ghana one of the highest GDP per capita in West Africa. Owing to a GDP rebasement, in 2011 Ghana became the fastest-growing economy in the world.

The Ghanaian domestic economy in 2012 revolved around services, which accounted for 50% of GDP and employed 28% of the work force. Besides the industrialization associated with minerals and oil, industrial development in Ghana remains basic, often associated with plastics (such as for chairs, plastic bags, razors and pens). 53.6% of Ghana's workforce were employed in agriculture in 2013.

Ghana embarked on a currency re-denomination exercise, from Cedi (₵) to the new currency, the Ghana Cedi (GH₵) in July 2007. The transfer rate is 1 Ghana Cedi for every 10,000 Cedis.

Ghana is Africa's largest gold producer, after overtaking South Africa in 2019 and second-largest cocoa producer (after Ivory Coast). It is also rich in diamonds,  manganese or manganese ore, bauxite, and oil. Most of its debt was canceled in 2005, but government spending was later allowed to balloon. Coupled with a plunge in oil prices, this led to an economic crisis that forced the government to negotiate a $920 million extended credit facility from the International Monetary Fund (IMF) in April 2015.

Taxation 
Value-added tax is a consumption tax administered in Ghana. The tax regime which started in 1998 had a single rate but since September 2007 entered into a multiple rate regime. In 1998, the rate of tax was 10% and amended in 2000 to 12.5%. The top income tax and corporate tax rates are 25%. Other taxes included with value-added tax (VAT), are national health insurance levy, and a capital gains tax. The overall tax burden was 12.1% of Ghana's total domestic income in 2013. Ghana's national budget was the equivalent of 39.8% of GDP in 2013. Ghana is implementing the rent tax in 2021.

Manufacturing 

Ghana's industrial base is relatively advanced. Import-substitution industries include electronics manufacturing. Rlg Communications is the first indigenous African company to assemble laptops, desktops, and mobile phones, and is West Africa's biggest information and communications technology (ICT) and mobile phone manufacturing company.

Ghana began its automotive industry with the construction of a prototype robust SUV, named the SMATI Turtle 1, intended for use in the rough African terrain. It was designed and manufactured by the Artisans of Suame Magazine Industrial Development Organization. Urban electric cars have been manufactured in Ghana since 2014.

As of 2012 there were four major companies in the textiles sector: Akosombo Textiles Limited, Tex Style Ghana Limited, Printex Ghana, and Ghana Textile Manufacturing Company.

Ghana National Petroleum Corporation and Ghana Oil Company deal with crude oil and gas exploration, exploitation, and refining.

Telecommunications 

At the end of January 2022, total number of voice subscription in Ghana stood at 41,380,751.This represents a percentage increase of 1.28% over December 2019 figures of 40,857,007. The total penetration rate stands at 136.79%.
Competition among mobile-phone companies in Ghana is an important part of the telecommunications industry growth, Current market leader MTN with voice subscription of 23,150,485 representing 55.95% of the market is followed by Vodafone with voice subscription of 9,075,795 representing 21.93% market share, AirtelTigo voice subscription stands at 8,428,322 representing 20.69%, Glo's current voice subscription stands at 726,149 which represent a market share of 1.75%.

The mass media of Ghana is among the most liberal in Africa, with Ghana ranking as the third-freest in Africa and 30th-most free in the world on the worldwide press freedom index. Chapter 12 of the Constitution of Ghana guarantees freedom of the Ghanaian press and the independence of the mass media, and Chapter 2 prohibits censorship. Ghanaian press freedom was restored in 1992.

Ghana was one of the first countries in Africa to achieve the connection to the World Wide Web. In 2010, there were 165 licensed internet service providers in Ghana and they were running 29 of the fiber optic, and authorized networks VSAT operators were 176, of which 57 functioned, and 99 internet operators were authorized to the public, and private data and packet-switched network operators were 25.Ghana is Africa’s leader in the adoption of digital financial services and usership of mobile money.

Data 

The following table shows the main economic indicators in 1980–2017. Inflation below 5% is in green.

Imports and Exports 
Ghana's top export products in 2016 were crude petroleum ($2.66B), gold ($2.39B), cocoa beans ($2.27B), cocoa paste ($382M) and cocoa butter ($252M). Ghana's top export destinations in 2016 were Switzerland ($1.73B), China ($1.06B), France ($939M), India ($789M) and the Netherlands ($778M).

Ghana's top import categories in 2016 were refined petroleum ($2.18B), crude petroleum ($546M), gold ($428M), rice ($328M) and packaged medicaments ($297M).  The nations with the highest value of imports to Ghana in 2016 were China ($4.1B), the Netherlands ($1.58B), the United States ($1.1B), Nigeria ($920M) and India ($668M).

Private banking 

The financial services in Ghana have seen a lot of reforms in the past years. The Banking (Amendment) Act 2007 included the awarding of a general banking license to qualified banks, which allows only indigenous Ghana offshore banks to operate in country Ghana. Indigenous Ghana private bank Capital Bank was the first to be awarded the general banking license in Ghana as well as indigenous Ghana private banks UniBank, National Investment Bank and Prudential Bank Limited. It has therefore become possible for Ghanaian non-resident individuals or residents and foreign companies or indigenous Ghana companies to open indigenous Ghana offshore bank accounts in Ghana. Indigenous Ghana retail and savings banks include Agricultural Development Bank of Ghana, CAL Bank, GCB Bank Ltd, Home Finance Company and UT Bank as well as indigenous Ghana savings and loan institutions ABii National and Savings and Loans Company.

Stock exchange 

The Stock Exchange of Ghana is one of the largest in Africa, with a market capitalization of GH¢57.2 billion or CN¥180.4 billion in 2012. South Africa's JSE Limited is the largest.

Energy 

As of 2018, Ghana consumed some 10 MMtoe of primary energy, made mostly of biomass (40%), oil and diesel (40%), followed by hydropower (10%) and natural gas (10%).

Oil & Gas 
Ghana discovered significant reserves of oil and natural gas offshore throughout the 2000s and 2010s. The country officially became an oil & gas producer in 2010 with the commissioning of the Jubilee field by Tullow Oil and currently produces from three major offshore hubs: Jubilee, TEN, and OCTP. In 2021, its production stood at some 150,000 barrels of oil per day (bopd). Since production began in 2010 Ghana has rose to be the 34th largest national producer of oil.

In 2021 Ghana exported more than 71mil barrels of oil. China was the largest importer of Ghana oil, receiving over 41% of exports with South Africa, the second largest importer, taking 13.9%.

Solar energy 
Ghana has aggressively begun the construction of solar plants across its sun-rich land in an aim to become the first country to get 6% of its energy from solar energy generation. Since construction began in the early 2010's electricity generation from solar has gone from zero KWh in 2014 to over 60 GWh in 2020, accounting for .46% of Ghana's electricity consumption.

Wind energy 

Ghana has Class 4–6 wind resources and high-wind locations, such as Nkwanta, the Accra Plains, and Kwahu and Gambaga mountains. The maximum energy that could be tapped from Ghana's available wind resource for electricity is estimated to be about 500–600 GWh/year. To give perspective: in 2011, per the same Energy Commission, the largest Akosombo hydroelectric dam in Ghana alone produced 6,495 GWh of electric power and, counting all Ghana's geothermal energy production in addition, the total energy generated was 11,200 GWh in that year. These assessments do not take into consideration further limiting factors such as land-use restrictions, the existing grid (or how far the wind resource may be from the grid) and accessibility.

Bio-energy 

Ghana has put in place mechanisms to attract investments into its biomass and bio-energy sectors to stimulate rural development, create jobs and save foreign exchange. Main investments in the bio-energy subsector existed in the areas of production, are transportation, storage, distribution, sale, marketing and exportation.

The goal of Ghana regarding bio-energy, as articulated by its energy sector policy, is to modernize and examine the benefits of bio-energy on a sustainable basis. Biomass is Ghana's dominant energy resource in terms of endowment and consumption, with the two primary bio-fuels consumed being ethanol and biodiesel. To that effect, the Ghana ministry of Energy in 2010 developed its energy sector strategy and development plan. Highlights of the strategy include sustaining the supply and efficient use of wood fuels while ensuring that their utilization does not lead to deforestation.

The plan would support private sector investments in the cultivation of bio-fuel feedstock, the extraction of bio-oil, and refining it into secondary products, thereby creating financial and tax incentives. The Ghana Renewal Energy Act provides the necessary fiscal incentives for renewable energy development by the private sector, and also details the control and management of bio-fuel and wood fuel projects in Ghana. The Ghana National Petroleum Authority (NPA) was tasked by the Renewable Energy Act 2011 to price Ghana's bio-fuel blend in accordance with the prescribed petroleum pricing formula.

The combined effects of climate change and global economic turbulence had triggered a sense of urgency among Ghanaian policymakers, industry and development practitioners to find sustainable and viable solutions in the area of bio-fuels.

Brazil, which makes ethanol from maize and sugarcane, is currently the world's largest bio-fuel market.

Energy consumption 
Electricity generation is one of the key factors in achieving the development of the Ghanaian national economy, with aggressive and rapid industrialization; Ghana's national electric energy consumption was 265 kilowatts per capita in 2009. Shortages of electricity have led to dumsor (blackouts), increasing the interest in renewables.

Hydrocarbon and mining 

Since these discoveries Ghana increased production steadily, the nations current peak is 200,000 barrels per day in 2019. Current production in 2021 stands at 179,900 barrels per day.

Ghana has vast natural gas reserves, which is used by many foreign multinational companies operating in Ghana. The hydrocarbon industry has had major implications for regional and urban development in Ghana and these are likely to substantially increase in the years to come

Mining has gained importance in the Ghanaian economy since the turn of the 21st century, with a growth of around 30% in 2007. The main mining extractions are bauxite, gold (Ghana is one of the largest gold producers in the world), and the phosphates.

Tourism 

The Ministry of Tourism has placed great emphasis upon further tourism support and development. Tourism contributed to 4.9% of GDP in 2009, attracting around 500,000 visitors. Tourist destinations include Ghana's many castles and forts, national parks, beaches, nature reserves, landscapes and World Heritage buildings and sites.

In 2011, Forbes magazine ranked Ghana eleventh-friendliest country in the world. The assertion was based on a survey of a cross-section of travelers in 2010. Of all the countries on the African continent that were included in the survey, Ghana ranked highest.

To enter Ghana, it is necessary to have a visa authorized by the Government of Ghana, except for certain entrepreneurs on business trips.

Agriculture 

In 2013 agriculture employed 53.6% of Ghana's total labor force. Agribusiness accounts for a small fraction of the gross domestic product. The main harvested crops are corn, plantain, rice, millet, sorghum, cassava and yam. Unlike the agricultural livestock, forestry and fishing sectors, the crop sector is key to the Ghanaian agricultural industry.

Ghana produced in 2018:

 20.8 million tons of cassava (4th largest producer in the world, second only to Nigeria, Thailand and Congo);
 7.8 million tonnes of yam (2nd largest producer in the world, second only to Nigeria);
 4.1 million tons of plantain (2nd largest producer in the world, just behind Congo);
 2.6 million tons of palm oil (8th largest producer in the world);
 2.3 million tons of maize;
 1.4 million tons of taro (4th largest producer in the world, second only to Nigeria, China and Cameroon);
 947 thousand tons of cocoa (2nd largest producer in the world, second only to Ivory Coast);
 769 thousand tons of rice;
 753 thousand tons of orange (19th largest producer in the world);
 713 thousand tons of pineapple (11th largest producer in the world);
 521 thousand tons of peanut;

In addition to smaller productions of other agricultural products, like sweet potato (151 thousand tons), natural rubber (23 thousand tons) and tobacco (2.3 thousand tons).

Ghana: Vision 2020 and industrialization 
With the economic program "Ghana: Vision 2020", Ghana intends to achieve its goals of accelerated economic growth and improved quality of life for all its citizens, by reducing poverty through private investment, rapid and aggressive industrialization, and direct and aggressive poverty-alleviation efforts. These plans were released in the 1995 government report, Ghana: Vision 2020. Nationalization of state-owned enterprises continues, with about two thirds of 300 parastatal enterprises owned by the government of Ghana. Other reforms adopted under the government's structural adjustment program include increasing exchange rate controls and increasing autarky and increasing restrictions on imports.

The Ghana: Vision 2020 forecast assumes political stability; successful economic stabilization; the implementation of Ghana: Vision 2020 policy agenda on private sector growth; and aggressive public spending on social services, infrastructure and industrialization. It projection states that Ghana's goals of reaching high-income economy status and newly industrialized country status will be easily realized between 2020 and 2039.

Economic transparency 

The judicial system of Ghana deals with corruption, economic malpractice and lack of economic transparency. Despite significant economic progress, obstacles do remain. Particular institutions need reform, and property rights need improvement. The overall investment regime lacks market transparency. Tackling these issues will be necessary if Ghana's rapid economic growth is to be maintained.

According to Transparency International's Corruption Perception Index of 2018, out of 180 countries, Ghana was ranked 78th, with a score of 41 on a scale where a 0–9 score means highly corrupt, and a 90–100 score means very clean. This was based on perceived levels of public sector corruption. John Addo Kufuor, son of former President John Agyekum Kufuor and Kojo Annan, son of former Secretary-General of the United Nations Kofi Annan, have been named in association with the Panama Papers.

Health and biotechnology 
The Centre for Scientific Research into Plant Medicine is an agency of the Ministry of Health that was set up in the 1970s for research and development and as a practical resource (product production & distribution/provision) primarily in areas of biotechnology related to medicinal plants. This includes both herbal medicine and work on more advanced applications. It also has a secondary role as an educational resource for foreign students in health, biotechnology and related fields.

Cybernetics and cyberwarfare 

The use of computer technology for teaching and learning began to receive government of Ghana's attention from the late 1990s. The information and communications technology in education policy of Ghana requires the use of information and communications technology for teaching and learning at all levels of education. The Ministry of Education supports institutions in teaching of information and communications technology literacy. The majority of secondary, and some basic schools of Ghana have computer laboratories.

Ghana's intention to become the information technology hub of West Africa has led the government of Ghana to enact cyber crime legislation and enhance cyber security practices. Acting on that goal, in 2008 Ghana passed the Electronic Communications Act and the Electronic Transactions Act, which established the legal framework for governing information technology. In November 2011, the Deputy Minister for Communications and Technology announced the development of a national cyber security strategy, aimed at combating cyber crime and securing critical infrastructure.

In June 2012, the National Information Technology Agency announced a national computer emergency response team "strategy" designed to co-ordinate government response to cyber-attacks, both internal and external. The agency also established computer emergency response teams for each municipal, metropolitan, and district assembly to improve co-ordination and information-sharing on cyberspace threats. Ghana is ranked 2nd in Africa and 7th globally in cyber warfare, cyber-terrorism, cyber crime, and internet crime. In 2018, the National Cyber Security Centre was founded. It is the national agency responsible for cybersecurity. In November 2020, Parliament passed the Cybersecurity Act 2020. The Minister for Communications, Ursula Owusu-Ekuful, indicated that, "a successful economy is hinged on a secured, safe and resilient national digital ecosystem. Cyber-security is, therefore, very critical to the economic development of the country and essential to the protection of the rights of individuals within the national digital ecosystem".

Real estate 

The real estate and housing market has become an important and strategic economic sector, particularly in the urban centres of south Ghana such as Accra, Kumasi, Sekondi-Takoradi and Tema. However, many of its citizens particularly those in Accra cannot afford the housing prices which is a trait of most major cities globally particularly in the West. Kumasi is growing at a faster rate than Accra, and there is less competition in its real estate market. The gross rental income tax of Ghana is withheld at 10%, capital gains are taxed at 15% with a 5% gift tax imposed on the transfer of properties and Ghana's real estate market is divided into 3 areas: public sector real estate development, emerging private sector real estate development, and private individuals. The activities of these 3 groups are facilitated by the Ghanaian banks and the primary mortgage market which has demonstrated enormous growth potential. Recent developments have given birth to a boom in the construction sector, including the housing and public housing sector generating and injecting billions of dollars annually into the Ghanaian economy. The real estate market investment perspective and attraction comes from Ghana's tropical location and robust political stability. An increasing number of the Ghanaian populace are investing in properties, and the Ghana government is empowering the private sector in the real estate direction.

Trade and exports 

In July 2013, International Enterprise Singapore a global office in Accra to develop trade and investment on logistics, oil and gas, aviation, transportation and consumer sectors. Singapore and Ghana also signed four bilateral agreements to promote public sector and private sector collaboration, as Ghana aims to predominantly shift its economic trade partnership to East Asia and Southeast Asia. The economic centre is IE Singapore's second office in Africa. Ghana's labour force in 2008 totalled 11.5 million Ghanaian citizens. Tema Harbour is Africa's largest manmade harbour, and Takoradi Harbour along with Tema harbour handle goods and exports. They are also traffic junctions where goods are transhipped; the Tema harbour handles the majority of the nation's export cargo and most of the country's chief exports is shipped from Takoradi harbour. The Takoradi harbour and Tema harbour are operated by the state-owned Ghana Ports and Harbours Authority.

See also 
 Economic history of Ghana
 United Nations Economic Commission for Africa
 List of countries by gold production

References

Notes

External links 
 Google Earth Map of the oil and gas infrastructure in Ghana
 World Bank Trade Summary Statistics Ghana

 
Economics in developing countries